Statistics of Campeonato da 1ª Divisão do Futebol in the 1994 season.

Overview
Lam Pak won the championship.

References
RSSSF

Campeonato da 1ª Divisão do Futebol seasons
Macau
Macau
football